The Code Conspiracy is a 2002 American thriller film written and directed by Hank Whetstone and starring Jim Fitzpatrick, Maria Conchita Alonso, and David Warner for The Asylum.  The film had a preliminary release at the 2000 New York Independent Film and Video Festival.

Plot
A physics professor (David Warner) is removed from his post because his classroom teaching methods are considered to be too philosophical. He leaves for Israel to work on a project combining science with his love of philosophy.

Six years later he returns to an America now governed by an administration that has brought in strong anti-privacy laws.  He is carrying a disc containing the fruits of his research to give to a former student, John Davis (Jim Fitzpatrick), when black ops agents track him down with a view to obtaining the disc and killing him.  He manages to hide the disc and make a phone call to John before the agents catch up with him.  In subsequent police interviews with Davis he is able to assure them he did not know what was going on, a situation that changes after he listens to his phone messages.

The professor had been working on a code in Israel based on the Pentateuch, the first five books in the Bible, and had found answers to some of life's most basic questions. The formula he has discovered can also solve problems yet to be formulated.  John's software company is pleased with the research since it helps them with their current anti-government privacy project: keyless encryption.  Before he is able to complete the sale and distribution of the software to a major company, government agents raid his home and company, confiscating all his computers, files and computer programs.  While trying to leave the area with his family and move to a more congenial environment, his wife and children are killed in a plane crash.  In shock, he turns to friends who help him to escape undetected.  Not only American agents but the Mossad give chase as he flees to the Bahamas.

Cast

 Jim Fitzpatrick as John Davis
 Maria Conchita Alonso as Rachel
 David Warner as Professor
 Lou Rawls as Carriage Driver
 Marc Macaulay as Commander
 Tom Nowicki as Chris
 Key Howard as Rocket Scientist
 Jim R. Coleman as Stephen
 Holland Hayes as Dail
 Russell Warner as Ben
 Gail Borges as Mac
 Drew Palmer as Frank
 Bill Cordell as Hunter
 Ashlee Payne as Sarah
 Steve Zurk as Bruce
 Hank Stone as Killer Agent
 Rus Blackwell as Slick Agent

References

External links

 

2002 thriller films
2002 films
American thriller films
Films shot in the Bahamas
Films shot in Florida
The Asylum films
2000s English-language films
2000s American films